Paul David Hudson (born 27 February 1971) is an English weather presenter for BBC Yorkshire and BBC Yorkshire and Lincolnshire. Hudson was born and raised  in Keighley, West Yorkshire. He was made an  Honorary Fellow of Bradford College in 2014.

After reading geophysics and planetary physics at Newcastle University, Hudson joined the Met Office and trained for two years at Leeds Weather Centre. Hudson combined this with a two-year stint as a weather presenter for BBC Look North and for the BBC local radio stations in Leeds, York, Humberside and Sheffield.

Hudson is known for his tongue-in-cheek banter with BBC Look North presenter Harry Gration, and also Peter Levy, presenter of BBC Look North for the East Riding, Lincolnshire and parts of Nottinghamshire via the Belmont transmitter.

Early life 
Hudson was born in Keighley, West Riding of Yorkshire. His parents purchased his first 'kids weather centre' when he was seven, and by the age of twelve he was compiling his own meteorological records (now archived by Keighley Library) and writing for local newspapers Keighley News and Telegraph & Argus. He went to the Brontë Middle School and Oakbank School on Oakworth Road in Keighley.

Hudson has a first-class degree in geophysics and planetary physics from the University of Newcastle. His early memories of local weather forecasting came from fellow Yorkshireman, Doncaster's Bob Rust.

Paul Hudson was present during the catastrophic fire at Valley parade in 1985.

Hudson attended training at the Meteorological Office College, situated at the former RAF Shinfield base in Shinfield, Berkshire. Due to a shortage of available posts within the Met Office, he worked as a geophysicist for an oil business in London.

Career
After university and training at the Met Office College, Hudson worked for an oil business as a geophysicist until joining the Met Office as an international forecaster involving monsoons and typhoons.

Television
Hudson can be seen on Three editions of the regional news programmes Look North, from Leeds (serving North, West and South Yorkshire and the North Midlands)  Hull (serving East Yorkshire, Lincolnshire and north Norfolk) and Newcastle (serving North East, Cumbria and Northumberland

Hudson returned to the BBC Yorkshire weather centre from the Met Office's old home of Bracknell in 1997 when Darren Bett left to present national forecasts.

In The Little Prince, Hudson voice-acted the English dubbing for The Great Inventor (during the Planet of Bubble Gob trilogy) and Ferdinand (Planet of the Globies).

BBC climate change correspondent
Although most BBC forecasters are not directly employed by the BBC, but by the Department for Business, Innovation and Skills' Met Office (formerly the MOD's Met Office), since 2007 Hudson has been a full-time member of BBC staff, not the Meteorological Office, acting as an environmental and climate change expert. Hudson gives talks on the subject to local organisations and schools and has appeared on BBC One's Morning Show.

Radio
Hudson can also be heard on BBC Radio Leeds, BBC Radio Sheffield, BBC Radio York, BBC Radio Humberside, BBC Radio Lincolnshire, BBC Radio Cumbria, BBC Radio Newcastle, BBC Radio Tees

Wetwang public office
In May 2006, Hudson was elected honorary Mayor of Wetwang. This post was previously occupied by Richard Whiteley.

Publications
Hudson has written several books.

Cityzap
In December 2020, he become the voice of the new Transdev Coastliner Cityzap buses running the fast way along the M1 between Leeds and York.

Personal life
Hudson was married to Nicola Shaw, a fellow BBC presenter, in 2003 having two children. He enjoys sea fishing, playing golf (he used to play at Riddlesden golf club, and now plays at Moor Allerton), cricket (he played for Ingrow St Johns in the Craven League). He supports Bradford City, having a twenty-five-year season ticket, and was trapped in the stand that caught fire in the Bradford City stadium fire of 1985.

See also
 Weather forecasting
 Keeley Donovan
Weather rock

References

External links
 Look North biography
 BBC Weather blog

BBC weather forecasters
Alumni of Newcastle University
1971 births
Living people
People from Keighley
Climate activists
Mayors of places in Yorkshire and the Humber